Shae Anderson (born April 7, 1999) is an American athlete who competes primarily in the 400m.

From Norco, California, she studied at the University of Oregon and the University of California, Los Angeles and in 2020 broke the UCLA indoor 400m record twice and helping the women's 4x400m team to a UCLA indoor record.

She was a 2018 IAAF World U20 Championships gold medalist in the 4x400m.

At the 2020 United States Olympic Trials (track and field) held in Eugene, Oregon, Anderson reached the final of the 400m and qualified for the relay pool of the 4x400m relay at the 2020 Summer Games.

References

External links
 

Living people
1999 births
American female sprinters
People from Norco, California
Oregon Ducks women's track and field athletes
UCLA Bruins women's track and field athletes
Track and field athletes from California